The 1949–50 international cricket season was from September 1949 to April 1950.

Season overview

November

Commonwealth in India

December

Australia in South Africa

February

Commonwealth in Ceylon

March

Ceylon in Pakistan

References

International cricket competitions by season
1949 in cricket
1950 in cricket